Villa Carlotta is the name of two landmark buildings in greater Los Angeles, California.

Altadena

Villa Carlotta is a 7,000-square-foot Mission Revival-style house at 234 East Mendocino Street in Altadena, California. It was listed on the National Register of Historic Places in 2014. Completed in 1917, it was one of the first houses in Altadena in which electrical wiring was incorporated into the original architectural plans.

The house was built by Francis Raymond Welles, who hired architect Myron Hunt. Hunt incorporated features of the Welles' family estate in France in the plans for Villa Carlotta, as evidenced by the house's high ceilings and tall windows.

Franklin Village

Villa Carlotta is a 50-unit Spanish Colonial-style apartment house at 5959 Franklin Avenue in the Franklin Village neighborhood of Hollywood, California. It was built in 1926 for the widow of Thomas H. Ince and designated a Los Angeles historical cultural monument in 1986.

The four-story building was designed by Arthur E. Harvey, who also designed the nearby Château Élysée.

The building's notable tenants include actor Edward G. Robinson, actress Marion Davies, writer William Saroyan, film producer David O. Selznick, and architect Wallace Neff. Louella Parsons wrote her gossip column from her two-story apartment in the building.

The Lesser family trust owned the building from the 1950s to 2014, when it was bought by investment firm CGI Strategies. Gidi Cohen and Adrian Goldstein of CGI Strategies are committed to restoring and renovating the historic building with a focus on preserving its architectural heritage, including keeping and refreshing the features and fixtures that made it a special place for residents and visitors. The renovation work allow for the building to be shared by the entire community. In 2018, Villa Carlotta and CGI Strategies received the California Preservation Design Award.

It took CGI Strategies two years to restore Villa Carlotta. They carefully painted stenciled wood beams and coffered ceilings by hand and preserved much of the original wood, stone, and marble. CGI Strategies' restoration retained Villa Carlotta’s original 1926 contractor to fabricate and install new exterior awnings.

References

Houses in Altadena, California
History of Los Angeles County, California
Los Angeles Historic-Cultural Monuments
Buildings and structures on the National Register of Historic Places in Los Angeles County, California
Myron Hunt buildings